Ronald Anthony Urlich (born 8 February 1944) is a former New Zealand rugby union player. A hooker, Urlich represented Auckland at a provincial level, and was a member of the New Zealand national side, the All Blacks, from 1970 to 1973. He played 35 matches for the All Blacks including two internationals.

References

1944 births
Living people
Rugby union players from Auckland
People educated at Mount Albert Grammar School
New Zealand rugby union players
New Zealand international rugby union players
New Zealand people of Croatian descent
Auckland rugby union players
Rugby union hookers